
Control is a fictional character created by John le Carré.  Control is an intelligence officer who acts as the head of the British overseas intelligence agency  (nicknamed  "The Circus" after its location in Cambridge Circus, London). He is a character in the novels The Spy Who Came in from the Cold, The Looking Glass War and Tinker Tailor Soldier Spy, and is referred to in several others, usually by association with le Carré's recurring protagonist George Smiley, who has served as Control's right-hand man.

"Control" is a nom de guerre; the character's real name is never given, and it is suggested that he successfully kept his true identity secret even from his inner circle of advisors. His wife believes him to be a minor civil servant in the Ministry of Agriculture and Fisheries. In the original screenplay for the film adaptation of Tinker Tailor Soldier Spy, Smiley muses that Control had once told him that Howard Staunton was the greatest chess master Britain had ever produced. "Staunton" later turns out to be the name that Control used for the rental of a flat he uses.

The real chief of the Secret Intelligence Service (the equivalent of Le Carre's Circus) is known by a similar name: "C". This originates from the initial used by Captain Sir Mansfield Smith-Cumming, RN, an early chief of the service, who signed his letters "C" in green ink. This custom has been upheld throughout the history of the service.

In the novels
Control does not appear in the first two George Smiley novels. In The Spy Who Came in from the Cold, le Carré's third novel, Control is already chief of the Circus, a position which was occupied by a civil servant named Maston, with whom Smiley clashed, in the first novel. Although he makes only comparatively fleeting appearances in The Spy Who Came in from the Cold and The Looking Glass War, in both novels Control is depicted as a master strategist who orchestrates a successful intelligence operation for the Circus. The Spy Who Came in from the Cold also shows him as quite ruthless, concealing from his own agent Alec Leamas the true aim of the operation on which Leamas was sent to East Germany, and having – against Leamas' express wish – got Leamas' beloved, Liz Gold, deeply involved in his plot, eventually leading to her death. 

In Tinker Tailor Soldier Spy, Control has died of natural causes as the story begins; several characters reminisce on the inglorious end of his career, which was due to the infiltration of the Circus by a high-level mole run by the Soviet spymaster Karla. Control spent his final few months in office, already ill, losing power to his underling Percy Alleline and desperately trying to identify this mole, before falling into a trap set up by Karla to accelerate his departure.

However, in that same book, another character, Roddy Martindale, claims Control is still alive; that he faked his death after being "driven out" by Alleline and has been seen in South Africa. Martindale has heard this second-hand, and tells Smiley, who rejects it as "the most idiotic story [he] has ever heard."  Though he does not share this, George recalls personally attending Control's cremation.

In A Legacy of Spies, during Peter Guillam's initial interview, it is revealed that there have been at least four "Controls" over the years.

In other media

Film
Cyril Cusack portrayed Control in the 1965 film adaptation of The Spy Who Came In from the Cold.
In the 2011 adaptation of Tinker Tailor Soldier Spy, Control was played by John Hurt. He is shown signing himself as "C", and a photograph is briefly shown of a younger Control in uniform as a brigadier during the Second World War.

Television
Alexander Knox portrayed Control in the 1979 television drama adaptation of Tinker Tailor Soldier Spy.

References

Characters in British novels of the 20th century
John le Carré
Fictional British secret agents
Fictional secret agents and spies
Fictional spymasters